This is a diagrammatic map of the Great Central Main Line, part of the former Great Central Railway network. The map shows the line as it currently is (please refer to legend), and includes all stations (open or closed). Some nearby lines and branch lines are also shown, though most stations are omitted on such lines if they are closed. In addition, the Great Western and Great Central Joint Railway is also shown. The Great Central Main Line is always shown in the middle of the diagram.

{{Routemap
|style = float:none;margin:auto;
|title = Great Central Main Line
|title-bg = #be2d2c
|map =
Manchester Lines to ~~ ~~! !CONTg
 ! !BHF
kABZg2
\STRc2\ABZg3!~kSTRc1\kSTRl+4!~STR+l\CONTfq~~ ~~ ~~Huddersfield line
! !STRc2\STR3+1\HST!~STRc24\STR3\
~~ ~~! !LSTR+1\STRc4\ABZg+1\STRc4\
HST~~
! !kSTRc2\kHST3+l\ABZgr\\
Hope Valley line~~ ~~! !kLLSTR+1\exlCONTg@F\HST\\~~
exSTRl\eABZgr+r\~~ ~~ ~~
HST~~
kSTRc2\kKRZ3+lu\ABZ1+rxf!~lCONTf1~~to Huddersfield line
Stockport–Stalybridge line~~ ~~! !CONTgq\exSTR+r!~kkSTRr+1!~kSTR2+r\eABZgl+l!~kSTRc3\exSHI4lq\~~
exSTR\kABZg+4\
exSTR\HST\~~
\exkSTR2\ABZgl\ABZq+l\CONTfq~~to 
\exkSTRc1\exkSTRl+4!~lMKRZvo!~STR+c2\xKRZq3u\exCONTfq~~Stalybridge Junction Railway
\ABZg+1\STRc4
STRc2\ABZg3\
! !LSTR!~STRc2\HST3+1\eHST!~STRc4\\~~
ABZg+1\STRc4\HST\\~~
~~ ~~! !LSTR\\eHST\\~~
HST~~
eHST~~
~~ ~~! !exCONTgq\eABZg+r\
HST~~
HST~~
HST~~
! !KHSTaq\ABZgr+r\
KHSTxe~~
exHST~~
exHST~~
exTUNNEL1~~ ~~ ~~Woodhead Tunnel
exHST~~
exHST~~
\exABZgl\exCONTfq~~ ~~ ~~to Crow Edge
\xABZg+l\CONTfq~~ ~~ ~~Penistone Line to 
HST~~
\xABZgl\CONTfq~~ ~~ ~~Penistone Line to 
exHST~~
exHST~~
\exABZg+l\exKBSTeq
exHST~~
! !KBSTaq\xABZg+r\
eHST~~
eHST~~
eHST~~
~~ ~~! !LSTR\\eHST\\~~
Midland Main Line~~ ~~! !CONTgq\ABZg+r\\eHST\\\~~
 ! !BHF2\STRc3\eBHF\\~~
\STRc1\ABZ4+2l\KRZo!~STRc3\kSTR2+r\kSTRc3\~~ ~~ ~~Midland Main Line
Nunnery Junction~~ ~~! !\STRc1\ABZg+4\\kLLSTR+4~~ ~~ ~~Woodburn Junction
Darnall Junction~~ ~~! !\d!~ABZgl+l\d!~POINTERf@g\CONTfq~~ ~~ ~~
! !HST
! !\\HST\exSTRc2\exLSTR3~~ ~~ ~~
Woodhouse Junction~~ ~~! !\exSTRc2\exSTR3!~kABZg2\exSTR+1\exSTRc4
Orgreave Colliery~~ ~~! !\\exKBST1\eSTR+c4!~kSTRc1\xkKRZl+4u!~exkSTRc2\ekABZq+3\CONTfq~~ ~~ ~~
! !\eHST\exkABZg+1
Beighton level crossing~~ ~~! !\BUE\exSTR!~POINTERg@fq~~ ~~ ~~Waleswood Curve
Beighton Junction~~ ~~! !\xKRWgl\xKRWg+r
kSTRc2\xkKRZ3+lo\xABZgr
Midland Main Line (Old Road)~~ ~~! !\kSTR+1!~POINTERf@rgq\exABZg+l\exKRZo\exCONTfq
\eABZg+l\exKRZu\exKRZu\exCONTfq~~ ~~ ~~
\STR\exABZgl\exABZql\exCONTfq~~ ~~ ~~
! !eHST\exHST\~~
eABZg+l\exKRZu+xl\exKBSTeq~~ ~~ ~~Colliery branch
! !eHST\exHST\~~
\ABZgl+l\xKRZu\kSTR2+r\kSTRc3
! !\STR\exHST\\ekHST+4~~ ~~~~(MR)
to ~~ ~~! !CONTgq\ABZg+r!~exSTRc2\exABZg23\exSTRc23\eABZg3
exSTRc2\eKRZ3+1o\exSTR!~exSTRc14\exABZ+14\CONTf!~exSTRc4~~ ~~ ~~to Robin Hood Line
! !exHST+1\eSTR+c4\exSTR\exKBSTe\~~ ~~ ~~Colliery branch
! !exHST\BHF\exSTR\\~~
! !exBHF\STR\exABZgl+l\exSTR2+r\exSTRc3~~ ~~ ~~Duckmanton Junction
! !exKBHFaq\exKRZu!~STRc2\xKRZq3o\exKRZo\exHSTq!~exSTRc1\exABZq+4\exCONTfq~~ ~~~~
STRc2\xKRX2u\exSTRc3!~STRc4\exSTR\\\
Midland Railway~~ ~~! !CONT1\exSTRc1!~STRc4\exHSTl+4\exABZg+r\\\~~
Colliery branch! !exKBSTaq\exKRZu\exSTR+r
\exKRWg+l\exKRWr
exHST~~
\exKRWgl\exKRW+r
Colliery branch! !exKBSTaq\exKRZu\exSTRr
Colliery branch! !\exKBSTaq\exKRZu\exABZ+lr\exKBSTeq~~Colliery branch
\exKRWg+l\exKRWr
exHST~~
exHST~~
\exABZgl\exKBSTeq~~Colliery branch
Colliery branch! !exKBSTaq\exABZg+lr\exKBSTeq~~Colliery branch
exBST~~ ~~ ~~New Hucknall Sidings
Colliery branch! !\exKBSTaq\exABZgr\d\exd-CONT2\exdSTRc3\dCONTg@G~~ ~~ ~~
! !\\exHST\exSTRc1!~lBHFc2\exSTR3+4!~xv-ABZg3!~lBHFc3~~ ~~ ~~to  Junction~~ ~~! !\CONTgq\xKRZo!~STRc2\ABZ1+3r!~lBHFc1\exv-STR!~lBHFc4~~
Kirkby South Junction~~ ~~! !\\xABZg+1\STRc4\exv-STR
\\c\xKRWgl\KRW+r\c\exkSTR3
exkSTRc2\exkSTR3+l!~kSTRc2\xkABZq+3\xKRZu\excSTRq!~STRr\exkSTRr+1\exkSTRc4\cd
exkSTR+1\kSTR+1!~lhSTRa@f\exSTRc2\exABZg3\\\~~ ~~ ~~
ex3ABZg+1\e3KRZo-\ex3STR+4!~exSTR+1\exHST!~exSTRc4\\\~~
Annesley colliery! !exKBSTe\STR\exSTR\exDST\\\~~Annesley yard and loco shed
STR\exSTR2\exHST!~exSTRc3\\~~Robin Hood Line~~ ~~! !POINTERf@lgq!~kSTR2\exSTRc1\exKRZ2+4o\exSTRc3\
! !kSTRc1\kHSTl+4\xKRZo!~exSTRc1\eKRZq+4u\3STR2+r
! !\\exHST\exHST\v-3HST~~ 
kSTRc2\kSTR3+l\xKRZo\xKRZo\3STRr+1
kSTR+1\\exHST\exSTR\~~
STR\\exSTR+c2\exABZg3\~~ ~~ ~~Bestwood Junction
 ! !HST\\exABZg+1\exSTR+c4\~~ ~~ ~~Bulwell Common North Junction
Bulwell Common South Junction~~ ~~! !STR\c\exSTRc2!~POINTERf@rfq\exdABZg3!~exldHST-\c\exSTR\~~~~ ~~! !exCONTgq\eKRZu\exdHSTq\excdSTRq!~excdSTRr+1!~excdSTR2+r\exdKRZo!~exdSTRc34\excSTRq\exABZ2+gr\exSTRc3\~~
Bagthorpe Junction~~ ~~! !STR\\excSTRc1\exdABZg+4\c\exSTRc1\exLSTR+4
STR\\exHST\\~~to Erewash Valley line~~ ~~! !CONT2\STR+c3\\exTUNNEL1\\\
Radford Junction~~ ~~! !STRc1\ABZg+4\\exHST\\exLSTR\~~
! !\eHST\\exTUNNEL1\\exABZg+l\exCONTfq~~ ~~ ~~to Nottingham–Grantham lineSTR\\exBHF\\exSTR~~
STR\\exTUNNEL1\exSTRc2\exABZg3
Weekday Cross Junction~~ ~~! !STR\\exABZgl\exHSTr+1\exKBHFe!~exSTRc4~~
 ! !STR+l\ABZqlr+xr\BHFq\xKRZo\STRq\CONTfq\~~ ~~ ~~~~ ~~! !LSTR\exSTR\\exHST\\\~~
exSTR\\exYRD\\~~ ~~ ~~Queen's Walk yard
exABZg+l\exSTRq\exABZgr\\
Clifton colliery! !exKBSTe\d\exhbKRZWae\d\~~ ~~ ~~River Trent
exdYRD~~ ~~ ~~Wilford brick sidings
exHST!~lENDE@F~~
\KRWgl\KRW+r~~Ruddington North Junction
\STR\BUE~~Asher Lane crossing
! !exKBSTa\\STR\KDSTe\~~ 
British Gypsum! !exBST\\eYRD\\~~ ~~ ~~Gotham sidings
Gotham branch! !ex3STR2\ex-3STRq\e3ABZg3\\
HST~~
eHST~~
Barnstone lime quarry! !exKBSTaq\eKRZu\exSTR+r
\eKRWg+l\exKRWr~~ ~~! !LSTR\\\c\edYRD\c\\\~~ ~~ ~~Barnstone lime sidings
Brush Traction! !kSTR2\STR+l\KBSTeq\xABZg2\STRc3\\~~ ~~ ~~Loughborough North Junction
! !kSTRc1\kSTRl+4!~STRl\BHFq\xKRZo!~STRc1\ABZ2+4r\STRc3\~~ ~~ ~~Loughborough South Junction
! !\\KBHFxa\STRc1\STR+4
! !\\HST\\HST~~Mountsorrel quarry branch~~ ~~! !\\eABZg+l\exKBSTeq\BST~~ ~~ ~~LaFarge Aggregates
Swithland Sidings! !\\c\dYRD\c\\HST~~
! !\\\HST\\STR\POINTER3~~ ~~ ~~Syston Junction
! !\\\eHST\\ABZgl+l\CONTfq~~ ~~ ~~! !\\KHSTxe\\HST~~
Abbey Lane sidings! !\\c\exdYRD\c\\STR!~POINTERg@fq~~ ~~ ~~Midland Main Line ! !\\exBHF\\BHF~~
! !\exKBHFa\exYRD\\STR~~Leicester goods yard to ~~ ~~! !CONTgq\eABZqr\xKRZuxl\STRq\ABZgxr+r~~ ~~! !c!~lCONTg@Gq\STR2+r\cdSTRc3\exABZg+l\exSHI4rq\STR
! !\\cSTRc1\HSTl+4\xdKRZo\c!~cdLSTRq\d!~exSHI4+lq!~lHST~L\d!~dSTRq\lHST~R!~xABZgr!~ABZ2+gr\STRc3~~
! !\\\exHST\\exLSTR!~STRc1\CONT4~~ ~~ ~~M1 motorway~~ ~~! !\\exSKRZ-Bo\\exkLLSTR3~~ ~~! !LSTR\exkSTRc2\exkSTR3+l\exKRZo\exkSTRr+1\exkSTRc4\~~ ~~ ~~Midland Counties Railway! !STR\exkLLSTR+1\\exHST\\\
! !kSTR2\exLSTR\\exHST\exSTRc2\exCONT3\~~ ~~ ~~~~! !kSTRc1\exSTRl!~kSTRl+4\BHFq\xKRZo\eABZq1\ABZq2!~exSTRc4\CONTfq!~STRc3~~ ~~ ~~Northampton loop lineRugby cattle sidings~~ ~~! !\\\c\exdYRD\\\cSTRc1\LSTR+4~~ ~~ ~~exBHF~~
exdYRD~~ ~~ ~~Barby MOD sidings
! !exHST~~ ~~! !\exCONTgq\exKRZo\exHSTq\exCONTfq~~
exTUNNEL1~~ ~~ ~~Catesby Tunnel
! !exHST
exYRD~~Woodford New and Old Yards
exHST~~~~ ~~! !exCONTgq\exKRZoxr+xr\exCONTfq
exSTRc2\exABZg3\~~ ~~ ~~Culworth Junction
! !exSTRc2\exHST3+1\exHST!~exSTRc4\\~~
! !exHST+1\exSTRc4\exSTR\\Chiltern Main Line~~ ~~! !CONTgq\xABZg+r\\exSTR\\\
! !BHF\\exSTR\exSTRc2\exCONT3~~ ~~ ~~Towcester–Banbury line''~~ ~~! !eABZgl\exABZq+r\exKRZo\exHSTr+1\exSTRc4~~
! !HST\exSTR!~POINTER+4\exHST\\~~
! !STR\exHST2\exHST!~exSTRc3\\~~
Aynho Junction~~ ~~! !STRc2\ABZg3\exSTRc1\exKRZ2+4o\exSTRc3\\~~ ~~ ~~

Great Central Railway